The Sisters of the Divine Savior (also known as the Salvatorian Sisters) is a Roman Catholic religious institute co-founded on December 8, 1888, in Tivoli, Italy. Founder, Blessed Francis Mary of the Cross Jordan, was beatified on May 15, 2021, in Rome. He also founded the Salvatorian Fathers and Brothers in 1881. Co-founder Blessed Mary of the Apostles (Therese von Wüllenweber), born February 19, 1833, was beatified by Pope Paul VI on October 13, 1968, in Rome. Worldwide, the institute has about 1200 sisters in 26 countries on five continents. Conventionally, the letters SDS are used to identify the institute.

Activities
For many years in the United States, the institute served in education and health care. Today, the Sisters serve in pastoral care, jail ministry, spiritual direction, ESL tutoring and advocacy for anti-human trafficking efforts. The U.S. Province is headquartered in Milwaukee, Wisconsin. The Sisters serve as religious sponsor for Divine Savior Holy Angels High School and Hadley Terrace Senior Apartments, all in Milwaukee.

See also

Catholic religious order
Consecrated life
List of some religious institutes (Catholic)
Secular institute
Vocational Discernment in the Catholic Church

References

Sources
Sisters of the Divine Savior
Divine Savior Healthcare
St. Anne's Nursing Home
Divine Savior Holy Angels High School
German Wikipedia on Therese von Wüllenweber
German Wikipedia on Salvatorians
Formula of Beatification, by Paul VI
Anti-Human Trafficking Information
Stop Trafficking Newsletter

Organisation of Catholic religious orders
Religious organizations established in 1888
Catholic female orders and societies
Catholic religious institutes established in the 19th century
Salvatorian Order